Round 3 may refer to:

Round 3, mini album by Kim Hyun-joong
#ROUND3, Elise Estrada album
Round 3 wind farm, a third generation of wind farm developments in the UK
Fight Night Round 3, computer boxing game

Almost: Round Three, a third skateboard video of the Rodney Mullen vs. Daewon Song series